Mashinalno (in Russian: "Машинально"; translation to English: "Mechanically") - is an album released in 2004 by the company Sintez Records which consists of 12 songs by the popular Russian rock band Mashina Vremeni ("Time Machine"). The name of the album was chosen by means of competition. Fans were intended to suggest a name that fully reflects the album released in the year of 35th anniversary of the group. "Mechanically" stands for Russian word "Машинально" ("Mashinalno").

Track listing
 "Время пробует меня на зуб" (Andrei Makarevich)
 "Круги на воде" (Andrei Makarevich)
 "Кто из них я" (Evgeny Margulis, Andrei Makarevich)
 "Deep Purple in Rock" (Evgeny Margulis, Andrei Makarevich)
 "Эти реки никуда не текут" (Andrei Derzhavin, Andrei Makarevich))
 "По барабану" (Evgeny Margulis, Andrei Makarevich)
 "Не дай мне упасть" (Andrei Makarevich)
 "К Малой Бронной" (Alexander Kutikov, Andrei Makarevich)
 "Прости сегодня за вчера" (Evgeny Margulis)
 "Не повод для слез" (Andrei Makarevich)
 "Сакура-катана-сакэ" (Evgeny Margulis, Andrei Makarevich)
 "То, что люди поют по дороге домой" (Andrei Makarevich)

Band members
 Andrei Makarevich - guitar, vocals
 Alexander Kutikov - bass-guitar, vocals
 Valery Efremov - drums
 Evgeny Margulis - bass-guitar, guitar, vocals
 Andrei Derzhavin - keyboards

Sessional musicians
 S. Khutas - contrabass
 S. Ostroumov - drums
 V. Zharko - drums
 M. Klyagin - guitar
 A. Lev - guitar
 L. Kamener - grand piano

 

2004 albums